The State Register of Heritage Places is maintained by the Heritage Council of Western Australia. , 198 places are heritage-listed in the Shire of Collie, of which eight are on the State Register of Heritage Places.

List
The Western Australian State Register of Heritage Places, lists the following eight state registered places within the Shire of Collie:

References

Collie
 
Collie